François Demachy is a French perfumer. He was succeeded as Dior’s House Perfumer by Francis Kurkdjian, but he remained a perfumer under the LVMH umbrella brands.

Biography 
Born in Cannes, Demarchy has lived almost all his life in Grasse[1], where his father has a pharmacy. He studied dentistry, physiotherapy, then after working at Mane, studied at the school of perfumery company Charabot.

After five years of study at Charabot, Demachy joined Chanel, where he was appointed Director of Research and Development, collaborating simultaneously with the creation of perfumes of Chanel, Ungaro, Bourjois and Tiffany.[1] In 2006 he was appointed Director of Development for the LVMH cosmetics and perfumes division and Christian Dior's main nose. He also collaborates in the production of Fendi and Acqua di Parma perfumes, also by the LVMH group.[1]

In 2009, Dior released a flanker to its pillar fragrance Miss Dior Chérie, called Miss Dior Chérie L’Eau, signed by Demachy. British Vogue described this perfume as a “sparkling and distinctive floral scent blended with notes of tangy yet spicy bitter orange, Gardenia and white musks”. 

In 2011, Demachy oversaw significant revisions of fragrances Miss Dior and Miss Dior Chérie (eau de parfum). Miss Dior was reimagined by Demachy and this fragrance was renamed Miss Dior Original. Miss Dior Chérie became simply Miss Dior and though it retained similar packaging, the fragrance was significantly altered, also by Demachy although with less fanfare, and since then has born little resemblance to Christine Nagel’s original creation by the same name. These changes were part of Dior owner LVMH’s efforts to gain greater control over their perfume formulations. Prior to bringing on Demachy to create its perfumes in house, Dior has contracted out its fragrances and consequently Givaudan held the formula for Nagel’s creation. Demachy’s adjustments allowed Dior to take over Miss Dior Chérie without violating Givaudan’s copyright.

Creations

Dior 
 Aqua Fahrenheit (2011)
 Eau sauvage Cologne (2015)
 Eau sauvage Extrême (2010)
 Eau sauvage Fraîcheur Cuir (2007)
 Eau sauvage Parfum (2012)
 Escale to Portofino (2008)
 Dior Homme (2011)
 Dior Oud Ispahan (2012)
 Dior Homme Parfum (2014)
 Dior Homme (2020)
 Fahrenheit 32 (2007)
 Fahrenheit Absolute (2009)
 Hypnotic Poison (2000)
 Midnight Poison (2007)
 Miss Dior Cherie (2008)
 Miss Dior Couture Edition (2011)
 Miss Dior EDP(2017)
 Miss Dior Eau Fraiche (2012)
 Sauvage (2015)
 Fève délicieuse
 Sauvage Elixir (2021)
 Tobacolor (2021)

Emilio Pucci 
 Miss Pucci (2010)
 Vivara (2007)
 Vivara Silver Edition (2008)

Tiffany 
 Tiffany (1987)

References 

French perfumers
Year of birth missing (living people)
Living people
People from Cannes
LVMH people
People from Grasse